Zaruhi (Armenian: Զարուհի) is an Armenian feminine given name that may refer to
Zaruhi Kalemkaryan (1871–1971), prose writer, essayist, poet, and philanthropist of Armenian descent
Zaruhi Postanjyan (born 1972), Armenian Member of Parliament

Armenian feminine given names